Étiennette Marie Périne de Villemomble, née  Étiennette Le Marquis (1737–1806), was a French dancer and courtesan, the official royal mistress of Louis Philippe I, Duke of Orléans between 1759 and 1773. She was made dame de Villemomble in 1767.

References

 Guy Martignon - Yannick Lelardoux - Villemomble, 1500 ans d'Histoire - BD - Les amis du château - 2011

1737 births
1806 deaths
People from Dinan
18th-century French ballet dancers
Mistresses of French royalty
Burials at Père Lachaise Cemetery
French female dancers